The Boss Is Back! is an album by saxophonist Gene Ammons recorded in 1969 and released on the Prestige label.

Reception
Allmusic awarded the album 4 stars with its review by Scott Yanow stating, "The executives at Prestige must have been felt ecstatic when they heard Gene Ammons first play after his release from a very severe seven-year jail sentence. The great tenor proved to still be in his prime, his huge sound was unchanged and he was hungry to make new music... Ammons shows that he had not forgotten how to jam the blues either".

Track listing 
All compositions by Gene Ammons except where noted.
 "The Jungle Boss" (Gene Ammons, Junior Mance) – 5:36 
 "I Wonder" (Cecil Gant, Raymond Leveen) – 7:59    
 "Feeling Good" (Leslie Bricusse, Anthony Newley) – 5:42    
 "Tastin' the Jug" – 7:28    
 "Here's That Rainy Day" (Johnny Burke, Jimmy Van Heusen) – 6:07    
 "Madame Queen" – 6:48

Note 
Recorded at Van Gelder Studio in Englewood Cliffs, New Jersey on November 10 (tracks 1, 2 & 4-6) and November 11 (track 3), 1969

Personnel 
Gene Ammons – tenor saxophone
Prince James, Houston Person – tenor saxophone (track 1)
Junior Mance – piano (tracks 1, 2 & 4-6)
Sonny Phillips organ (track 3)  
Buster Williams – bass (tracks 1, 2 & 4-6)
Bob Bushnell – electric bass (track 3)
Frankie Jones (tracks 1, 2 & 4-6), Bernard Purdie (track 3) – drums
Candido – congas (tracks 1, 2 & 4-6)

References 

Gene Ammons albums
1969 albums
Prestige Records albums
Albums produced by Bob Porter (record producer)
Albums recorded at Van Gelder Studio